Nanzhan Subdistrict (南站街道) may refer to the following locations in the People's Republic of China:

 Nanzhan Subdistrict, Liuzhou, in Liunan District, Liuzhou, Guangxi
 Nanzhan Subdistrict, Zhangjiakou, in Qiaodong District, Zhangjiakou, Hebei
 Nanzhan Subdistrict, Wuxi, in Wuxi New Area, Jiangsu
 Nanzhan Subdistrict, Shenyang, in Heping District, Shenyang, Liaoning